Zirtang Rural District is a rural district (dehestan) in Kunani District, Kuhdasht County, Lorestan Province, Iran. At the 2006 census, its population was 6,444, in 1,207 families.  The rural district has 33 villages.

References 

Rural Districts of Lorestan Province
Kuhdasht County